Åge Edvin Tovan (born 21 September 1947 in Kristiansund) is a Norwegian politician for the Labour Party.

He served as a deputy representative to the Norwegian Parliament from Akershus during the terms 1993–1997, 1993–1997 and 2001–2005.

Tovan served as mayor for the municipality of Lørenskog between 2003 and 2015. Ragnhild Bergheim, former deputy mayor and also from the Labour Party, took over as mayor when Åge Tovan resigned.

In his younger days Tovan played football for Clausenengen FK, and was active in sport wrestling and athletics.

References

1947 births
Living people
Politicians from Kristiansund
Deputy members of the Storting
Labour Party (Norway) politicians
Mayors of places in Akershus
Norwegian footballers
Association footballers not categorized by position